Kim Seong-min is the common English spelling of a Korean name also spelled Kim Sung-min. It may refer to:
Kim Sung-min (actor) (1973–2016), South Korean actor
Kim Sung-min (footballer, born 1981), South Korean footballer
Kim Sung-min (footballer, born 1985), South Korean footballer
Kim Sung-min (judoka) (born 1987), South Korean judoka
Kim Sung-min (volleyball), South Korean volleyball player
Kim Seong-min (defector), North Korean defector who founded Free North Korea Radio
Kim Seong-min (field hockey), participant in 1999 Men's Hockey Champions Trophy
Kim Seong-min (model), winner of 2012 Miss World Korea